Jordan Kremyr (born July 7, 1986) is a Canadian former professional ice hockey forward who last played for the Tulsa Oilers of the ECHL.

Playing career
Kremyr attended Providence College where he played four seasons (2007-2011) of NCAA hockey with the Providence Friars, scoring 13 goals and 14 assists for 27 points, while earning 53 penalty minutes, in 104 games played.

On March 17, 2011, Kremyr signed a try-out agreement with the Alaska Aces of the ECHL, and stayed with the team through the next two seasons. On August 9, 2013, the Aces re-signed Kremyr to continue his play for the 2013–14 ECHL season.  On October 25, 2013 Kremyr was named an alternate captain for the 2013–14 season. Helping the club claim its third Kelly Cup in franchise history. Kremyr also managed to make his American Hockey League debut with affiliate, the Abbotsford Heat, contributing 1 goal in 16 games.

On August 27, 2014, Kremyr left the Aces organization after parts of four seasons, to sign a one-year contract with ECHL club, the Bakersfield Condors, an affiliate of the Edmonton Oilers

On August 19, 2015, Kremyr continued within the Oilers affiliations, in agreeing to a one-year deal with new  ECHL entrants the Norfolk Admirals. On October 15, 2015, Kremyr was traded before appearing with the Admirals to the Tulsa Oilers to begin the 2015–16 season.

Career statistics

References

External links

1986 births
Living people
Abbotsford Heat players
Alaska Aces (ECHL) players
Bakersfield Condors (1998–2015) players
Alberni Valley Bulldogs players
Canadian ice hockey left wingers
Chilliwack Chiefs players
Sportspeople from Surrey, British Columbia
Ice hockey people from British Columbia
Providence Friars men's ice hockey players
Tulsa Oilers (1992–present) players
Canadian expatriate ice hockey players in the United States